The Tummalapalle Mine is a uranium mine in Tumalapalli village located in Kadapa of the Indian state of Andhra Pradesh. Results from research conducted by the Atomic Energy Commission of India, in 2011, led the analysts to conclude that this mine might have one of the largest reserves of uranium in the world.

On 19 July 2011, Secretary of Department of Atomic Energy, Dr. S. Banerjee who is also the Chairman of the Atomic Energy Commission of India confirmed on reserves of 49,000 tonnes and suggested that there could even be three times larger the amounts which would make Tummalapalle the mine with the world's largest uranium deposits. The estimates were subsequently increased to 85,000 tonnes in 2014.

Earlier, uranium reserves were found only up to a depth of about 250 meters. The latest findings reportedly indicate that the reserves run as deep as 1,000 metres.

This finding substantially increased India’s capability of producing energy from nuclear plants. As of 2018, India was producing about 3.13% of its energy from nuclear plants. These findings suggest that this output can be increased to more than 30% by 2050, essential if India hopes to reduce its emissions, pollution and use of coal power. This domestic uranium find would not only boost India's nuclear energy plans but also help to reduce costs by switching from expensive sources of energy such as coal.

History
On 20 November 2007 the then Chief Minister Y. S. Rajasekhara Reddy laid the foundation stone for the mine.
UCIL commissioned Cuddapah Uranium Phase-1 Project with 3000 tonnes on 20 April 2012.

Geography

The mine is linked to Pulivendla through village roads leading to State Highway No.18, which connects Kadapa with Velidandla. The nearest railway station is Muddanurru on South Central Railway’s Hyderabad – Chennai BG Line, which is  towards the north-east.

Water resources
The mine will draw most of its water requirements from the river Chitravathi. Design, construction and commissioning work of intake well and pump house at Chitravati River basin, the water and effluent treatment plants and the condensate recovery unit at uranium ore processing plant and laying of cross-country pipeline from the river Chitravati to the uranium ore processing plant – all these tasks were contracted by Jamshedpur Utilities & Services Company (Jusco), a 100% subsidiary company of Tata Steel, on EPC basis. The water system project, the construction of which commenced in August 2008, was inaugurated by Srikumar Banerjee on 7 July 2011.

Uranium purification plant
The construction works for the first phase of the uranium purification was completed in 2012 and Cuddapah Uranium Phase-1 Project was commissioned with 3000 tonnes capacity on 20 April 2012. Phase one of the uranium purification plant has a capacity to treat 3,000 tonnes of ore per day. The Bhabha Atomic Research Centre (BARC) has developed an innovative, economically viable process for the recovery of low-grade uranium (less than 0.2%) from the Tummalapalle ore mine. As illustrated by Dr. A. K. Suri, Director of Materials Group, BARC,  "the main objective of making a techno-economically viable process flow-sheet is to reduce the number of stages of unit operations and conservations leachants(sic) by regeneration and recycle(sic) leading to minimisation of fresh water inventory as well as quantum(sic) of liquid effluent discharge for the most challenging low-grade uranium ore".

The hydro-metallurgical uranium purification plant which would be constructed in the mine's current lease period, will treat the dolomite based uraniferous which is found in the deposits. On the mode of operation, the Uranium Corporation of India report stated that "in the initial period of operation of mine, ore will be received from decline having particle size of 80% passing through 10 cm screen and will be transported by covered dumpers from the mine site to the ore processing plant and later by covered conveyor". This mine would be the first in the country to adopt alkali based leaching in place of the conventional acid based leaching method. This process was chosen on the basis of the nature of the ore found in the site. BARC has developed a well-integrated flowsheet for the process to treat the low-grade uranium ore extracted from the alkaline host rocks in Tummalapalle.

Minerals 
The Bonds Work Index of the Tummalapalle uranium ore sample is 13.6 kWh/tonne and the mineralogical composition is as follows,

See also
 Nuclear power in India
 Energy policy of India
 List of uranium mines
 Uranium market
 Uranium mining debate
 Uranium reserves
 Peak uranium
 Uranium mining controversy in Kakadu National Park
 Uranium metallurgy

References

External links
 Uranium Corporation of India – Official Website
 Process development studies for lowgrade Uranium deposits in alkaline host rocks of Tummalapalle Research paper of BARC at IAEA TM on Low Grade Uranium Deposits Vienna, 29 March 31, 2010
 fuel of future

Uranium mines in India
Mining in Andhra Pradesh
Geography of Kadapa district
2007 establishments in Andhra Pradesh